The Scrolls of Moses ( Ṣuḥuf Mūsā) are an ancient body of scripture mentioned twice in the Quran. They are part of the religious scriptures of Islam, although now they are believed to have been corrupted or lost. These scriptures are understood by Muslims to refer not to the Torah, the main Book of Law which Moses was given, but to an ancient text, which contained some of the inspired revelations which Moses received over his years of prophecy, which were then written down by Moses himself as well as his followers.

Background
In two Chapters, which are dated from the first Meccan period, there is a reference to the 'Leaves, Scrolls, Journals' (Suhuf) of Abraham (and of Moses), by which certain divinely inspired texts handwritten by the patriarchs are meant. These passages refer to the fact that the truth of God's message was present in the earliest revelations, Given to Abraham and Moses. Although Suhuf is generally understood to mean 'Scrolls', many translators - including Abdullah Yusuf Ali and Marmaduke Pickthall - have translated the verse as "The Books of Abraham and Moses".

Qur'anic mention
Moses, being a righteous prophet of God, received many revelations over his lifetime - the contents of which could be contained in this Book of Moses.

Identification

Jordanian scholar and professor of philosophy Ghazi bin Muhammad mentions that the "Scrolls of Moses" are identical to the Torah of Moses.

Many scholars  have speculated whether the "Books of Moses" refer to the Torah or other scriptures of Moses. But the Islamic belief that the Torah was, in its original form, a single scripture of Law, the plural emphasis on Books and not Book leads many  to believe that these Books are different. Qur'anic commentator Abdullah Yusuf Ali mentions  that it could be a possible reference to a lost book of the Israelites, suggesting the Book of the Wars of the Lord, an apocryphal book referred to in the Bible, in Numbers 21:14.

However, it is well known that the Jews usually refer to the Torah as The Five Books of Torah. Most notably, Deuteronomy, the fifth book, is distinct in many ways, and is referred to as 'Mishneh Torah' - a review of the Torah. There's also an ancient guideline requiring religious scribes to leave four blank lines between each of the books. This custom (recorded in Babylonian Talmud, bava batra pg.13) predated Muhammad by hundreds of years. For this reason it is plausible to assume that Muhammad is referring to the five scrolls of Moses as they were known.

See also
 Islamic holy books
 Sixth and Seventh Books of Moses

References

Islamic texts
Texts attributed to Moses